Choral Synagogue may refer to:

Belarus 
 Choral Synagogue (Brest)

Latvia
 Great Choral Synagogue (Riga)

Lithuania
 Kaunas Synagogue (Kaunus)
 Choral Synagogue (Vilnius)

Romania
 Templul Coral (Bucharest)

Russia
 Moscow Choral Synagogue (Moscow)
 Main Choral Synagogue (Rostov-on-Don)
 Choral Synagogue (Smolensk)
 Grand Choral Synagogue (St. Petersburg)

Ukraine
 Choral Synagogue (Bila Tserkva)
 Golden Rose Synagogue (Dnipro)
 Choral Synagogue (Drohobych)
 Kharkiv Choral Synagogue (Kharkiv)
 Brodsky Choral Synagogue (Kyiv)
 Great Choral Synagogue (Kyiv)

See also
 List of choral synagogues